Joe Robot and Anthropos were social robots at Media Lab Europe. They were developed to aid in research on anthropomorphism and to explore the illusion of life and intelligence during the development of a meaningful social interaction between artificial systems and people. As artificial systems enter our social space, we will inherently project/impose our interpretation on their actions similar to the techniques we employ in rationalising, for example, a pet's behaviour. This propensity to anthropomorphise should not be seen as a hindrance to social system development, but rather a useful mechanism that requires judicious examination and employment in social system research. A fundamental balance between function and form for human-robot interaction is necessary.

References
Duffy, B.R., "Anthropomorphism and The Social Robot", Special Issue on Socially Interactive Robots, Robotics and Autonomous Systems 42 (3-4), 31 March 2003, pp170–190

External links
The Anthropos Project

Prototype robots
Social robots